Fahlman is a surname. Notable people with the surname include:

Gregory Fahlman (born 1944), Canadian astronomer
Scott Fahlman (born 1948), American computer scientist 
Sven Fahlman (1914–2003), Swedish fencer